Jezero (lit. "Lake") is a village and a municipality in western Republika Srpska, an entity of Bosnia and Herzegovina. As of 2013, it has a population of 1,144 inhabitants, while the village of Jezero has a population of 581 inhabitants. A small part of the village in Jajce municipality has a population of 6.

Etymology 
The village name Jezero derives from the word jezero which in most Slavic languages (Bulgarian, Bosnian, Croatian, Czech,  and its closest written variations (Russian and ), as well as in Baltic languages means "lake".

Geography

Physical geography 
The Jezero municipality consists of hills, mountains and basins. The altitude is between 432 and 1267 meters, the highest mountains in the municipality are Gorica and Sinjakovo. The rivers that flow through the Jezero municipality are Pliva and Jošavka as well as their tributaries. Jezero is situated on location where the Pliva river enters Veliko Plivsko Lake.

Political geography 
The Jezero municipality is located in the northeastern part of Republika Srpska. It borders the municipalities of Mrkonjić Grad, Jajce and Šipovo. The Jezero municipality is one of the smaller municipalities of Republika Srpska, with an area of 55,6 km2 and makes up 0,23% of the total territory of the Republic of Srpska.

Climate 
The area of the Jezero municipality belongs to the zone of temperate continental climate with the average annual temperature of is 10.5 °C. The average annual rainfall is about 981 mm, and is evenly distributed throughout the year.

History

Ancient times 
Jezero has had a long history. It is supposed that there had been a settlement at that area even in the Illyrian period and, according to traditional stories, as the Illyrian queen Teuta had ordered, the channel was dug so that the Illyrian fortress was established on the river island where the large part of settlement is still located. Roads passed through Jezero in Roman period and in the Middle Ages. The fortress on the river island was conquered by the Ottoman military during their conquest of Bosnia in 1463.

Formation of Jezero municipality 
Before the war, the municipality of Jezero was a local community and belonged to the municipality of Jajce. After the signing of the Dayton Agreement (The General Framework Agreement for Peace in Bosnia and Herzegovina), inter-entity boundary line separated Jezero from Jajce. Thus the municipality of Jezero was established by the decision of the National Assembly of Republika Srpska in June 1996.

Demographics

Population

Ethnic composition

Tourism
The municipality of Jezero has significant water potential (rivers Pliva, Jošavka and rivers of Perućica, lake Đol in Ljoljići). Those potentials can be used for the development of tourism and hydro potential, ecology and protection of healthy environment.

The municipality Jezero is located on the river Pliva, halfway between Jajce and Šipovo at an altitude of 430 m. What is specific for Jezero is that it is located exactly on the confluence of the river Pliva with Great Pliva Lake, surrounded with beautiful mountain range. Except Pliva Lake, there are two more lakes nearby, those are Veliki Đol (Great Đol) and Mali Đol (Small Đol), places remarkably famous among the fishermen. Besides, Jezero has excellent conditions for paragliding, mountaineering and mountain-biking.

Jezero on Mars

In 2007, following the discovery of an ancient crater-lake on planet Mars, the feature was named Jezero Crater, after this village in Bosnia and Herzegovina, which is one of the country's several eponymous towns and villages.

In November 2018, it was announced that Jezero Crater had been chosen as the landing site for the planned Mars 2020 rover mission.

Sister relationships
 Susami,Japan

References

External links
 

Populated places in Jezero, Bosnia and Herzegovina
Populated places in Jajce
Municipalities of Republika Srpska